John or Jack Fitzgerald, or variants, may refer to:

Military
Sir John Forster FitzGerald (1785–1877), Irish soldier, officer in British Army during the Napoleonic wars and Liberal MP
John Fitzgerald (soldier) (1817–?), American soldier
John Fitzgerald (Medal of Honor) (1873–1948), American Medal of Honor recipient

Nobility
John FitzGerald, 1st Baron Desmond (died 1261)
John FitzGerald, 1st Earl of Kildare (c. 1250–1316), Irish nobleman
John FitzGerald, 4th Earl of Desmond (died 1399)
John FitzGerald, de facto 12th Earl of Desmond (died 1534)
John Fitzedmund Fitzgerald (died 1589), Irish baron
John FitzGerald, 18th Earl of Kildare (1661–1707)
Lord John FitzGerald (1952–2015), Irish nobleman

Politics and law

UK
John Fitzgerald (governor), Irish soldier and governor of Tangier
John FitzGerald, 15th Knight of Kerry (1706–1741), Irish MP for Dingle
John Fitzgerald (1775–1852), British MP for Seaford 1826–32
John FitzGerald, Baron FitzGerald (1816–1889), Irish judge and politician
Sir John Fitzgerald (brewer) (1857–1930), Lord Mayor of Newcastle upon Tyne, England, 1914–1915
Jack Fitzgerald (1873–1929), founding member of the Socialist Party of Great Britain
Jack Fitzgerald (politician) (John Fitzgerald, 1914–1994), Irish Labour Party politician

US
John Fitzgerald (Wisconsin politician) (c. 1827–1863), Wisconsin banker and politician
John Wesley Fitzgerald (1850–1908), American businessman and politician
John C. Fitzgerald (1863–1928), New York politician
John F. Fitzgerald (1863–1950), aka "Honey Fitz", mayor of Boston, grandfather and namesake of president John F. Kennedy
John J. Fitzgerald (1872–1952), U.S. representative from New York
John I. Fitzgerald (1882–1966), American attorney and politician in Massachusetts
John Moonan Fitzgerald (1923–2008), U.S. jurist and politician
John Warner Fitzgerald (1924–2006), Michigan chief justice
John P. Fitzgerald III, acting United States Trustee for Region 4 of the United States Trustee Program and respondent in Siegel v. Fitzgerald

Other figures in politics and law
John Daniel FitzGerald (1862–1922), Australian politician
John Fitzgerald (Australian politician) (1864–1936), member of the South Australian House of Assembly
Sir John FitzGerald of Dromana, MP for Dungarvan in the Irish Parliament

Science and medicine
John Patrick Fitzgerald (1815–1897), New Zealand doctor, community leader and hospital superintendent
John G. FitzGerald (1882–1940), Canadian physician
John Fitzgerald (computer scientist) (born 1965), British computer scientist and Chair of Formal Methods Europe

Sports

American football
John Fitzgerald (center) (born 1948), former Dallas Cowboys center
John Fitzgerald (quarterback) (born 1975), former quarterback with the af2's Austin Wranglers
John Fitzgerald (offensive guard), former University of Central Oklahoma lineman

Association football (soccer)
Jack Fitzgerald (footballer) (1930–2003), Irish footballer
John Fitzgerald (soccer) (born 1968), Canadian soccer player, businessman & corporate lawyer
John Fitzgerald (footballer) (born 1984), Irish footballer

Baseball
John Fitzgerald (Rochester Broncos pitcher) (1866–1892), pitcher for the 1890 Rochester Broncos
John Fitzgerald (Boston Reds pitcher) (1870–1921), pitcher for the 1891 Boston Reds
John Fitzgerald (1950s pitcher) (born 1933), pitcher for the 1958 San Francisco Giants
John Fitzgerald (catcher), Negro league baseball catcher

Other sports
John J. Fitz Gerald (1893–1963), American turf racing sportswriter
Jack Fitzgerald (cyclist) (born 1899), Australian cyclist
John Fitzgerald (Australian footballer, born 1961), former Geelong player
John Fitzgerald (Australian footballer, born 1901) (1901–1987), Fitzroy player
John Fitzgerald (tennis) (born 1960), Australian tennis player
John Fitzgerald (pentathlete) (born 1948), American modern pentathlete
John Fitzgerald (rugby union) (born 1961), Irish rugby union international player
Jack Fitzgerald (rugby league) (1925–1965), Australian rugby league player

Others
John Fitzgerald (priest), Dean of Cork
John Anster Fitzgerald (died 1906), English fairy painter and portrait artist
John Driscoll Fitz-Gerald (1873–1946), American scholar and philologist
John D. Fitzgerald (1906–1988), American author of children's books
John Fitzgerald (poet) (1927–2007), English Carmelite priest and philosopher and Welsh-language poet
John D. FitzGerald (born 1952), Irish economist and former director of the Economic and Social Research Institute
John S. Fitzgerald, a frontiersman and erstwhile companion to Hugh Glass

See also
Fitzgerald (disambiguation)